The Arizona Diamondbacks' 2014 season was the franchise's 17th season in Major League Baseball and their 17th season at Chase Field. The team finished with a record of 64–98, placing last in the NL West and having the worst record in the major leagues. General manager Kevin Towers was fired on September 5 and replaced by Dave Stewart. On September 26, manager Kirk Gibson was also fired, ending his 4-and-a-half year tenure as the Diamondbacks' manager. Bench coach Alan Trammell managed the final three games of the season. On October 13, Chip Hale was announced as the Diamondbacks' manager for 2015.

Regular season

March/April
This season, Major League Baseball scheduled the Diamondbacks and Los Angeles Dodgers to open the season with a two-game series at the Sydney Cricket Ground in Australia. As a result, both teams began spring training earlier than usual and played abbreviated Cactus League schedules before flying to Australia for the series.

Season standings

National League West

National League Standings

Record vs. opponents

Game log

|- align="center" bgcolor="ffbbbb"
| 1 || March 22 || Dodgers* || 3 – 1 || Kershaw (1–0) || Miley (0–1) || Jansen (1) || 38,266 || 0–1
|- align="center" bgcolor="ffbbbb"
| 2 || March 23 || Dodgers* || 7 – 5 || Ryu (1–0) || Cahill (0–1) || || 38,079 || 0–2
|- align="center" bgcolor="ffbbbb"
| 3 || March 31 || Giants || 9 – 8 || Machí (1–0) || Reed (0–1) || Romo (1) || 48,541 || 0–3
|-
| colspan=9 | *Game played at Sydney Cricket Ground in Sydney, Australia.
|-

|- align="center" bgcolor="bbffbb"
| 4 || April 1 || Giants || 5 – 4 || Miley (1–1) || Gutiérrez (0–1) || Reed (1) || 18,974 || 1–3
|- align="center" bgcolor="ffbbbb"
| 5 || April 2 || Giants || 2 – 0 || Hudson (1–0) || Cahill (0–2) || Romo (2) || 19,357 || 1–4
|- align="center" bgcolor="ffbbbb"
| 6 || April 3 || Giants || 8 – 5 || Machí (2–0) || Harris (0–1) || || 19,131 || 1–5
|- align="center" bgcolor="ffbbbb"
| 7 || April 4 || @ Rockies || 12 – 2 || Nicasio (1–0) || Delgado (0–1) || || 49,130 || 1–6
|- align="center" bgcolor="ffbbbb"
| 8 || April 5 || @ Rockies || 9 – 4 || Kahnle (1–0) || McCarthy (0–1) || || 34,407 || 1–7
|- align="center" bgcolor="bbffbb"
| 9 || April 6 || @ Rockies || 5 – 3 || Miley (2–1) || Anderson (0–2) || Reed (2) || 29,779 || 2–7
|- align="center" bgcolor="ffbbbb"
| 10 || April 8 || @ Giants || 7 – 3 || Hudson (2–0) || Cahill (0–3) || || 42,166 || 2–8
|- align="center" bgcolor="bbffbb"
| 11 || April 9 || @ Giants || 7 – 3 || Arroyo (1–0) || Lincecum (0–1) || Collmenter (1) || 41,157 || 3–8
|- align="center" bgcolor="bbffbb"
| 12 || April 10 || @ Giants || 6 – 5 (10) || Putz (1–0) || Petit (0–1) || Reed (3) || 41,577 || 4–8
|- align="center" bgcolor="ffbbbb"
| 13 || April 11 || Dodgers || 6 – 0 || Ryu (2–1) || McCarthy (0–2) || || 33,349 || 4–9
|- align="center" bgcolor="ffbbbb"
| 14 || April 12 || Dodgers || 8 – 5 || Greinke (3–0) || Miley (2–2) || Jansen (3) || 38,374 || 4–10
|- align="center" bgcolor="ffbbbb"
| 15 || April 13 || Dodgers || 8 – 6 || Haren (2–0) || Cahill (0–4) || Jansen (4) || 31,757 || 4–11
|- align="center" bgcolor="ffbbbb"
| 16 || April 14 || Mets || 7 – 3 || Wheeler (1–2) || Collmenter (0–1) || Torres (1) || 18,099 || 4–12
|- align="center" bgcolor="ffbbbb"
| 17 || April 15 || Mets || 9 – 0 || Mejía (2–0) || Arroyo (1–1) || || 21,969 || 4–13
|- align="center" bgcolor="ffbbbb"
| 18 || April 16 || Mets || 5 – 2 || Gee (1–0) || McCarthy (0–3) || || 19,673 || 4–14
|- align="center" bgcolor="bbffbb"
| 19 || April 18 || @ Dodgers || 4 – 2 (12) || Thatcher (1–0) || Pérez (0–1) || Cahill (1) || 47,680 || 5–14
|- align="center" bgcolor="ffbbbb"
| 20 || April 19 || @ Dodgers || 8 – 6 || Haren (3–0) || Bolsinger (0–1) || Jansen (6) || 48,541 || 5–15
|- align="center" bgcolor="ffbbbb"
| 21 || April 20 || @ Dodgers || 4 – 1 || Wright (1–0) || Collmenter (0–2) || Jansen (7) || 37,447 || 5–16
|- align="center" bgcolor="ffbbbb"
| 22 || April 21 || @ Cubs || 5 – 1 || Wood (1–2) || Arroyo (1–2) || || 32,439 || 5–17
|- align="center" bgcolor="ffbbbb"
| 23 || April 22 || @ Cubs || 9 – 2 || Hammel (3–1) || McCarthy (0–4) || || 35,381 || 5–18
|- align="center" bgcolor="bbffbb"
| 24 || April 23 || @ Cubs || 7 – 5 || Cahill (1–4) || Strop (0–2) || Reed (4) || 32,323 || 6–18
|- align="center" bgcolor="bbffbb"
| 25 || April 24 || @ Cubs || 5 – 2 || Bolsinger (1–1) || Jackson (1–2) || Reed (5) || 33,085 || 7–18
|- align="center" bgcolor="bbffbb"
| 26 || April 25 || Phillies || 5 – 4 || Collmenter (1–2) || Hernández (1–1) || Reed (6) || 28,168 || 8–18
|- align="center" bgcolor="ffbbbb"
| 27 || April 26 || Phillies || 6 – 5 || Manship (1–0) || Cahill (1–5) || Papelbon (7) || 35,462 || 8–19
|- align="center" bgcolor="ffbbbb"
| 28 || April 27 || Phillies || 2 – 0 || Burnett (1–1) || McCarthy (0–5) || Papelbon (8) || 30,022 || 8–20
|- align="center" bgcolor="ffbbbb"
| 29 || April 28 || Rockies || 8 – 5 || Morales (3–1) || Miley (2–3) || Hawkins (8) || 17,127 || 8–21
|- align="center" bgcolor="ffbbbb"
| 30 || April 29 || Rockies || 5 – 4 || Logan (1–0) || Reed (0–2) || Hawkins (9) || 19,702 || 8–22
|- align="center" bgcolor="bbffbb"
| 31 || April 30 || Rockies || 5 – 4 (10) || Reed (1–2) || Kahnle (2–1) || || 19,135 || 9–22
|-

|- align="center" bgcolor="bbffbb"
| 32 || May 2 || @ Padres || 2 – 0 || Arroyo (2–2) || Cashner (2–4) || Reed (7) || 27,032 || 10–22
|- align="center" bgcolor="bbffbb"
| 33 || May 3 || @ Padres || 4 – 3 || McCarthy (1–5) || Kennedy (2–4) || Reed (8) || 35,213 || 11–22
|- align="center" bgcolor="ffbbbb"
| 34 || May 4 || @ Padres || 4 – 3 || Street (1–0) || Pérez (0–1) || || 32,657 || 11–23
|- align="center" bgcolor="ffbbbb"
| 35 || May 5 || @ Brewers || 8 – 3 || Garza (2–3) || Bolsinger (1–2) || || 27,220 || 11–24
|- align="center" bgcolor="bbffbb"
| 36 || May 6 || @ Brewers || 7 – 5 || Marshall (1–0) || Kintzler (1–1) || Reed (9) || 27,497 || 12–24
|- align="center" bgcolor="bbffbb"
| 37 || May 7 || @ Brewers || 3 – 2 || Arroyo (3–2) || Peralta (4–2) || Reed (10) || 24,013 || 13–24
|- align="center" bgcolor="ffbbbb"
| 38 || May 9 || @ White Sox || 9 – 3 || Rienzo (3–0) || McCarthy (1–6) || || 19,118 || 13–25
|- align="center" bgcolor="bbffbb"
| 39 || May 10 || @ White Sox || 4 – 3 || Miley (3–3) || Quintana (1–3) || Reed (11) || 24,634 || 14–25
|- align="center" bgcolor="bbffbb"
| 40 || May 11 || @ White Sox || 5 – 1 || Anderson (1–0) || Noesí (0–3) || || 18,612 || 15–25
|- align="center" bgcolor="ffbbbb"
| 41 || May 12 || Nationals || 6 – 5 || Clippard (3–2) || Reed (1–3) || Soriano (8) || 16,555 || 15–26
|- align="center" bgcolor="bbffbb"
| 42 || May 13 || Nationals || 3 – 1 || Arroyo (4–2) || Strasburg (3–3) || || 19,025 || 16–26
|- align="center" bgcolor="ffbbbb"
| 43 || May 14 || Nationals || 5 – 1 || Clippard (4–2) || Ziegler (0–1) || || 18,325 || 16–27
|- align="center" bgcolor="ffbbbb"
| 44 || May 16 || Dodgers || 7 – 0 || Greinke (7–1) || Miley (3–4) || || 31,154 || 16–28
|- align="center" bgcolor="bbffbb"
| 45 || May 17 || Dodgers || 18 – 7 || Anderson (2–0) || Kershaw (2–1) || || 36,688 || 17–28
|- align="center" bgcolor="bbffbb"
| 46 || May 18 || Dodgers || 5 – 3 || Collmenter (2–2) || Haren (5–2) || Reed (12) || 35,406 || 18–28
|- align="center" bgcolor="ffbbbb"
| 47 || May 20 || @ Cardinals || 5 – 0 || Wainwright (7–2) || Arroyo (4–3) || || 42,252 || 18–29
|- align="center" bgcolor="ffbbbb"
| 48 || May 21 || @ Cardinals || 3 – 2 (12) || Maness (2–2) || Cahill (1–6) || || 40,542 || 18–30
|- align="center" bgcolor="ffbbbb"
| 49 || May 22 || @ Cardinals || 4 – 2 || Neshek (1–0) || Miley (3–5) || Rosenthal (14) || 40,787 || 18–31
|- align="center" bgcolor="bbbbbb"
| – || May 23 || @ Mets || colspan=6| Postponed (rain) Rescheduled for May 25
|- align="center" bgcolor="bbffbb"
| 50 || May 24 || @ Mets || 3 – 2 || Collmenter (3–2) || Wheeler (1–5) || Reed (13) || 24,551 || 19–31
|- align="center" bgcolor="bbffbb"
| 51 || May 25 || @ Mets || 2 – 1 || Marshall (2–0) || Mejía (4–1) || Reed (14) || n/a || 20–31
|- align="center" bgcolor="ffbbbb"
| 52 || May 25 || @ Mets || 4 – 2 || Matsuzaka (2–0) || Spruill (0–1) || Mejía (3) || 30,785 || 20–32
|- align="center" bgcolor="bbffbb"
| 53 || May 26 || Padres || 7 – 5 || Ziegler (1–1) || Quackenbush (0–1) || || 35,580 || 21–32
|- align="center" bgcolor="ffbbbb"
| 54 || May 27 || Padres || 4 – 3 || Quackenbush (1–1) || Marshall (2–1) || Street (15) || 17,862 || 21–33
|- align="center" bgcolor="bbffbb"
| 55 || May 28 || Padres || 12 – 6 || Anderson (3–0) || Stauffer (2–1) || || 22,233 || 22–33
|- align="center" bgcolor="bbffbb"
| 56 || May 29 || Reds || 4 – 0 || Collmenter (4–2) || Cingrani (2–5) || || 18,457 || 23–33
|- align="center" bgcolor="ffbbbb"
| 57 || May 30 || Reds || 6 – 4 || Leake (3–4) || Arroyo (4–4) || Chapman (6) || 19,826 || 23–34
|- align="center" bgcolor="ffbbbb"
| 58 || May 31 || Reds || 5 – 0 || Cueto (5–4) || McCarthy (1–7) || || 23,765 || 23–35
|-

|- align="center" bgcolor="ffbbbb"
| 59 || June 1 || Reds || 4 – 3 || Simón (7–3) || Miley (3–6) || Chapman (7) || 24,119 || 23–36
|- align="center" bgcolor="bbffbb"
| 60 || June 3 || @ Rockies || 4 – 2 || Anderson (4–0) || de la Rosa (6–4) || Reed (15) || 29,682 || 24–36
|- align="center" bgcolor="bbffbb"
| 61 || June 4 || @ Rockies || 16 – 8 || Ziegler (2–1) || Brothers (2–4) || || 26,199 || 25–36
|- align="center" bgcolor="bbffbb"
| 62 || June 5 || @ Rockies || 12 – 7 || Arroyo (5–4) || Nicasio (5–4) || || 26,521 || 26–36
|- align="center" bgcolor="ffbbbb"
| 63 || June 6 || Braves || 5 – 2 || Teherán (6–3) || McCarthy (1–8) || Kimbrel (16) || 24,504 || 26–37
|- align="center" bgcolor="bbffbb"
| 64 || June 7 || Braves || 4 – 3 (11) || Delgado (1–1) || Carpenter (4–1) || || 29,278 || 27–37
|- align="center" bgcolor="bbffbb"
| 65 || June 8 || Braves || 6 – 5 || Anderson (5–0) || Harang (4–5) || Ziegler (1) || 26,534 || 28–37
|- align="center" bgcolor="ffbbbb"
| 66 || June 9 || Astros || 4 – 3 || Cosart (5–5) || Collmenter (4–3) || Qualls (8) || 18,805 || 28–38
|- align="center" bgcolor="bbffbb"
| 67 || June 10 || Astros || 4 – 1 || Arroyo (6–4) || Fields (1–4) || Reed (16) || 17,667 || 29–38
|- align="center" bgcolor="ffbbbb"
| 68 || June 11 || @ Astros || 5 – 1 || Keuchel (8–3) || McCarthy (1–9) || || 24,319 || 29–39
|- align="center" bgcolor="ffbbbb"
| 69 || June 12 || @ Astros || 5 – 4 (10) || Sipp (1–0) || Putz (1–1) || || 33,457 || 29–40
|- align="center" bgcolor="ffbbbb"
| 70 || June 13 || @ Dodgers || 4 – 3 || Kershaw (6–2) || Anderson (5–1) || Jansen (18) || 42,831 || 29–41
|- align="center" bgcolor="ffbbbb"
| 71 || June 14 || @ Dodgers || 6 – 4 || Haren (7–4) || Collmenter (4–4) || Jansen (19) || 51,422 || 29–42
|- align="center" bgcolor="bbffbb"
| 72 || June 15 || @ Dodgers || 6 – 3 || Arroyo (7–4) || Beckett (4–4) || || 52,519 || 30–42
|- align="center" bgcolor="ffbbbb"
| 73 || June 16 || Brewers || 9 – 3 || Peralta (7–5) || Harris (0–2) || || 18,262 || 30–43
|- align="center" bgcolor="ffbbbb"
| 74 || June 17 || Brewers || 7 – 5 || Lohse (8–2) || Marshall (2–2) || Rodríguez (22) || 18,148 || 30–44
|- align="center" bgcolor="bbffbb"
| 75 || June 18 || Brewers || 4 – 3 || Ziegler (3–1) || Kintzler (1–3) || || 19,711 || 31–44
|- align="center" bgcolor="ffbbbb"
| 76 || June 19 || Brewers || 4 – 1 || Gallardo (5–4) || Anderson (5–2) || Rodríguez (23) || 22,559 || 31–45
|- align="center" bgcolor="bbffbb"
| 77 || June 20 || Giants || 4 – 1 || Collmenter (5–4) || Lincecum (5–5) || Reed (17) || 29,295 || 32–45
|- align="center" bgcolor="ffbbbb"
| 78 || June 21 || Giants || 6 – 4 || Vogelsong (5–3) || McCarthy (1–10) || Romo (21) || 37,916 || 32–46
|- align="center" bgcolor="ffbbbb"
| 79 || June 22 || Giants || 4 – 1 || Bumgarner (9–4) || Bolsinger (1–3) || Romo (22) || 27,862 || 32–47
|- align="center" bgcolor="bbffbb"
| 80 || June 24 || Indians || 9 – 8 (14) || Collmenter (6–4) || Lowe (0–1) || || 20,945 || 33–47
|- align="center" bgcolor="ffbbbb"
| 81 || June 25 || Indians || 6 – 1 || Kluber (7–5) || Anderson (5–3) || || 21,269 || 33–48
|- align="center" bgcolor="bbffbb"
| 82 || June 27 || @ Padres || 2 – 1 || McCarthy (2–10) || Ross (6–8) || Reed (18) || 25,897 || 34–48
|- align="center" bgcolor="bbffbb"
| 83 || June 28 || @ Padres || 3 – 1 || Collmenter (7–4) || Stults (2–11) || Reed (19) || 31,527 || 35–48
|- align="center" bgcolor="ffbbbb"
| 84 || June 29 || @ Padres || 2 – 1 || Despaigne (2–0) || Bolsinger (1–4) || Street (21) || 20,267 || 35–49
|-

|- align="center" bgcolor="ffbbbb"
| 85 || July 1 || @ Pirates || 3 – 2 || Frieri (1–3) || Reed (1–4) || || 21,426 || 35–50
|- align="center" bgcolor="ffbbbb"
| 86 || July 2 || @ Pirates || 5 – 1 || Morton (5–9) || Anderson (5–4) || || 24,161 || 35–51
|- align="center" bgcolor="bbffbb"
| 87 || July 3 || @ Pirates || 10 – 2 || McCarthy (3–10) || Worley (2–1) || || 27,473 || 36–51
|- align="center" bgcolor="ffbbbb"
| 88 || July 4 || @ Braves || 5 – 2 || Santana (7–5) || Collmenter (7–5) || Kimbrel (27) || 48,815 || 36–52
|- align="center" bgcolor="ffbbbb"
| 89 || July 5 || @ Braves || 10 – 4 || Harang (8–6) || Bolsinger (1–5) || || 30,405 || 36–53
|- align="center" bgcolor="bbffbb"
| 90 || July 6 || @ Braves || 3 – 1 || Miley (4–6) || Wood (6–7) || Reed (20) || 23,709 || 37–53
|- align="center" bgcolor="bbffbb"
| 91 || July 7 || Marlins || 9 – 1 || Anderson (6–4) || Koehler (6–7) || || 17,103 || 38–53
|- align="center" bgcolor="ffbbbb"
| 92 || July 8 || Marlins || 2 – 1 || Dunn (7–4) || Reed (1–5) || Cishek (20) || 18,319 || 38–54
|- align="center" bgcolor="bbffbb"
| 93 || July 9 || Marlins || 4 – 3 (10) || Ziegler (4–1) || Cishek (4–5) || || 18,268 || 39–54
|- align="center" bgcolor="ffbbbb"
| 94 || July 11 || @ Giants || 5 – 0 || Lincecum (9–5) || Bolsinger (1–6) || || 41,647 || 39–55
|- align="center" bgcolor="bbffbb"
| 95 || July 12 || @ Giants || 2 – 0 || Miley (5–6) || Vogelsong (5–7) || Reed (21) || 41,261 || 40–55
|- align="center" bgcolor="ffbbbb"
| 96 || July 13 || @ Giants || 8 – 4 || Bumgarner (10–7) || Nuño (2–6) || || 41,288 || 40–56
|- align="center" bgcolor="bbffbb"
| 97 || July 18 || Cubs || 5 – 4 || de la Rosa (1–0) || Schlitter (2–3) || Reed (22) || 32,619 || 41–56
|- align="center" bgcolor="bbffbb"
| 98 || July 19 || Cubs || 9 – 3 || Miley (6–6) || Wood (7–9) || || 32,528 || 42–56
|- align="center" bgcolor="bbffbb"
| 99 || July 20 || Cubs || 3 – 2 || Collmenter (8–5) || Arrieta (5–2) || Reed (23) || 37,131 || 43–56
|- align="center" bgcolor="ffbbbb"
| 100 || July 21 || Tigers || 4 – 3 || Verlander (9–8) || Delgado (1–2) || Nathan (20) || 25,907 || 43–57
|- align="center" bgcolor="bbffbb"
| 101 || July 22 || Tigers || 5 – 4 || de la Rosa (2–0) || Coke (1–2) || Reed (24) || 29,515 || 44–57
|- align="center" bgcolor="ffbbbb"
| 102 || July 23 || Tigers || 11 – 5 || Sánchez (7–4) || Cahill (1–7) || || 24,174 || 44–58
|- align="center" bgcolor="ffbbbb"
| 103 || July 25 || @ Phillies || 9 – 5 || Kendrick (5–10) || Miley (6–7) || || 25,698 || 44–59
|- align="center" bgcolor="bbffbb"
| 104 || July 26 || @ Phillies || 10 – 6 (10) || Marshall (3–2) || Bastardo (4–4) || || 29,097 || 45–59
|- align="center" bgcolor="ffbbbb"
| 105 || July 27 || @ Phillies || 4 – 2 || Hernández (5–8) || Nuño (2–7) || Papelbon (25) || 31,514 || 45–60
|- align="center" bgcolor="bbffbb"
| 106 || July 28 || @ Reds || 2 – 1 (15) || Pérez (1–1) || Hoover (1–8) || Reed (25) || 30,288 || 46–60
|- align="center" bgcolor="ffbbbb"
| 107 || July 29 || @ Reds || 3 – 0 || Leake (8–9) || Cahill (1–8) || Chapman (23) || 33,153 || 46–61
|- align="center" bgcolor="bbffbb"
| 108 || July 30 || @ Reds || 5 – 4 || Miley (7–7) || Simón (12–6) || Reed (26) || 26,332 || 47–61
|- align="center" bgcolor="bbffbb"
| 109 || July 31 || Pirates || 7 – 4 || Pérez (2–1) || Locke (2–3) || Reed (27) || 20,145 || 48–61
|-

|- align="center" bgcolor="ffbbbb"
| 110 || August 1 || Pirates || 9 – 4 || Watson (8–1) || Schultz (0–1) || || 22,766 || 48–62
|- align="center" bgcolor="ffbbbb"
| 111 || August 2 || Pirates || 8 – 3 || Hughes (6–2) || Ziegler (4–2) || || 33,151 || 48–63
|- align="center" bgcolor="bbffbb"
| 112 || August 3 || Pirates || 3 – 2 (10) || Marshall (4–2) || Melançon (1–3) || || 26,913 || 49–63
|- align="center" bgcolor="ffbbbb"
| 113 || August 5 || Royals || 12 – 2 || Duffy (6–10) || Miley (7–8) || || 16,677 || 49–64
|- align="center" bgcolor="ffbbbb"
| 114 || August 6 || Royals || 4 – 3 || Ventura (9–8) || Collmenter (8–6) || Holland (32) || 16,157 || 49–65
|- align="center" bgcolor="ffbbbb"
| 115 || August 7 || Royals || 6 – 2 || Guthrie (8–9) || Nuño (2–8) || || 17,809 || 49–66
|- align="center" bgcolor="bbffbb"
| 116 || August 8 || Rockies || 5 – 3 || Anderson (7–4) || Matzek (2–7) || || 21,782 || 50–66
|- align="center" bgcolor="bbffbb"
| 117 || August 9 || Rockies || 14 – 4 || Cahill (2–8) || de la Rosa (11–8) || || 24,993 || 51–66
|- align="center" bgcolor="ffbbbb"
| 118 || August 10 || Rockies || 5 – 3 (10) || Bélisle (3–6) || Pérez (2–2) || Hawkins (18) || 22,104 || 51–67
|- align="center" bgcolor="bbbbbb"
| – || August 12 || @ Indians || colspan=6| Postponed (rain) Rescheduled for August 13
|- align="center" bgcolor="ffbbbb"
| 119 || August 13 || @ Indians || 3 – 2 || Allen (4–2) || Delgado (1–3) || || n/a || 51–68
|- align="center" bgcolor="bbffbb"
| 120 || August 13 || @ Indians || 1 – 0 (12) || Delgado (2–3) || Lee (0–1) || Reed (28) || 17,562 || 52–68
|- align="center" bgcolor="ffbbbb"
| 121 || August 14 || @ Marlins || 5 – 4 (10) || Dunn (10–5) || Hagens (0–1) || || 17,074 || 52–69
|- align="center" bgcolor="bbffbb"
| 122 || August 15 || @ Marlins || 3 – 2 || Cahill (3–8) || Hand (2–5) || Reed (29) || 18,286 || 53–69
|- align="center" bgcolor="ffbbbb"
| 123 || August 16 || @ Marlins || 2 – 1 || Álvarez (9–5) || Miley (7–9) || Cishek (31) || 19,563 || 53–70
|- align="center" bgcolor="ffbbbb"
| 124 || August 17 || @ Marlins || 10 – 3 || Koehler (9–9) || Collmenter (8–7) || || 19,296 || 53–71
|- align="center" bgcolor="ffbbbb"
| 125 || August 18 || @ Nationals || 5 – 4 (11) || Stammen (3–4) || Harris (0–3) || || 21,292 || 53–72
|- align="center" bgcolor="ffbbbb"
| 126 || August 19 || @ Nationals || 8 – 1 || Strasburg (10–10) || Anderson (7–5) || || 26,827 || 53–73
|- align="center" bgcolor="ffbbbb"
| 127 || August 20 || @ Nationals || 3 – 2 || Soriano (3–1) || Marshall (4–3) || || 24,113 || 53–74
|- align="center" bgcolor="ffbbbb"
| 128 || August 21 || @ Nationals || 1 – 0 || Soriano (4–1) || Pérez (2–3) || || 32,311 || 53–75
|- align="center" bgcolor="bbffbb"
| 129 || August 22 || Padres || 5 – 1 || Collmenter (9–7) || Despaigne (3–5) || || 24,835 || 54–75
|- align="center" bgcolor="bbffbb"
| 130 || August 23 || Padres || 5 – 2 || Pérez (3–3) || Quackenbush (2–3) || Reed (30) || 30,583 || 55–75
|- align="center" bgcolor="ffbbbb"
| 131 || August 24 || Padres || 7 – 4 || Kennedy (10–11) || Anderson (7–6) || Benoit (8) || 20,852 || 55–76
|- align="center" bgcolor="ffbbbb"
| 132 || August 26 || Dodgers || 9 – 5 || Hernández (8–9) || Cahill (3–9) || || 21,758 || 55–77
|- align="center" bgcolor="ffbbbb"
| 133 || August 27 || Dodgers || 3 – 1 || Kershaw (16–3) || Miley (7–10) || Jansen (38) || 28,394 || 55–78
|- align="center" bgcolor="bbffbb"
| 134 || August 29 || Rockies || 5 – 2 || Ziegler (5–2) || Brothers (4–6) || Reed (31) || 22,585 || 56–78
|- align="center" bgcolor="ffbbbb"
| 135 || August 30 || Rockies || 2 – 0 || Matzek (4–9) || Nuño (2–9) || Hawkins (22) || 27,272 || 56–79
|- align="center" bgcolor="bbffbb"
| 136 || August 31 || Rockies || 6 – 2 || Anderson (8–6) || de la Rosa (13–10) || || 22,948 || 57–79
|-

|- align="center" bgcolor="ffbbbb"
| 137 || September 1 || @ Padres || 3 – 1 || Ross (13–12) || Cahill (3–10) || Quackenbush (2) || 18,564 || 57–80
|- align="center" bgcolor="ffbbbb"
| 138 || September 2 || @ Padres || 2 – 1 || Quackenbush (3–3) || Ziegler (5–3) || || 14,316 || 57–81
|- align="center" bgcolor="bbffbb"
| 139 || September 3 || @ Padres || 6 – 1 || Collmenter (10–7) || Cashner (2–7) || || 16,335 || 58–81
|- align="center" bgcolor="bbffbb"
| 140 || September 4 || @ Padres || 5 – 1 || Delgado (3–3) || Kennedy (10–12) || || 16,025 || 59–81
|- align="center" bgcolor="ffbbbb"
| 141 || September 5 || @ Dodgers || 2 – 1 || Haren (12–10) || Nuño (2–10) || Jansen (40) || 43,074 || 59–82
|- align="center" bgcolor="ffbbbb"
| 142 || September 6 || @ Dodgers || 5 – 2 || Wilson (2–3) || Hudson (0–1) || Jansen (41) || 50,823 || 59–83
|- align="center" bgcolor="ffbbbb"
| 143 || September 7 || @ Dodgers || 7 – 2 || Greinke (14–8) || Cahill (3–11) || || 43,460 || 59–84
|- align="center" bgcolor="ffbbbb"
| 144 || September 9 || @ Giants || 5 – 1 || Petit (5–3) || Miley (7–11) || || 41,683 || 59–85
|- align="center" bgcolor="ffbbbb"
| 145 || September 10 || @ Giants || 5 – 0 || Machí (7–1) || Pérez (3–4) || || 41,293 || 59–86
|- align="center" bgcolor="ffbbbb"
| 146 || September 11 || @ Giants || 6 – 2 || Peavy (6–13) || Delgado (3–4) || || 41,039 || 59–87
|- align="center" bgcolor="ffbbbb"
| 147 || September 12 || Padres || 6 – 5 || Stults (7–16) || Nuño (2–11) || Quackenbush (3) || 31,238 || 59–88
|- align="center" bgcolor="bbffbb"
| 148 || September 13 || Padres || 10 – 4 || Anderson (9–6) || Ross (13–14) || || 32,429 || 60–88
|- align="center" bgcolor="bbffbb"
| 149 || September 14 || Padres || 8 – 6 || Spruill (1–1) || Despaigne (3–7) || || 26,075 || 61–88
|- align="center" bgcolor="bbffbb"
| 150 || September 15 || Giants || 6 – 2 || Miley (8–11) || Vogelsong (8–11) || || 21,731 || 62–88
|- align="center" bgcolor="ffbbbb"
| 151 || September 16 || Giants || 2 – 1 || Peavy (7–13) || Collmenter (10–8) || Casilla (16) || 26,339 || 62–89
|- align="center" bgcolor="ffbbbb"
| 152 || September 17 || Giants || 4 – 2 || Romo (6–4) || Reed (1–6) || Casilla (17) || 19,272 || 62–90
|- align="center" bgcolor="ffbbbb"
| 153 || September 18 || @ Rockies || 7 – 6 || Hawkins (4–3) || Reed (1–7) || || 23,775 || 62–91
|- align="center" bgcolor="ffbbbb"
| 154 || September 19 || @ Rockies || 15 – 3 || Lyles (7–3) || Anderson (9–7) || || 37,022 || 62–92
|- align="center" bgcolor="ffbbbb"
| 155 || September 20 || @ Rockies || 5 – 1 || Butler (1–1) || Cahill (3–12) || || 33,764 || 62–93
|- align="center" bgcolor="ffbbbb"
| 156 || September 21 || @ Rockies || 8 – 3 || Bergman (3–4) || Miley (8–12) || || 29,036 || 62–94
|- align="center" bgcolor="bbffbb"
| 157 || September 22 || @ Twins || 6 – 2 || Collmenter (11–8) || Nolasco (5–12) || || 22,571 || 63–94
|- align="center" bgcolor="ffbbbb"
| 158 || September 23 || @ Twins || 6 – 3 || Gibson (13–11) || Chafin (0–1) || || 28,902 || 63–95
|- align="center" bgcolor="ffbbbb"
| 159 || September 24 || @ Twins || 2 – 1 || Hughes (16–10) || Nuño (2–12) || Burton (3) || 29,445 || 63–96
|- align="center" bgcolor="ffbbbb"
| 160 || September 26 || Cardinals || 7 – 6 (10) || Gonzales (4–2) || Marshall (4–4) || Rosenthal (45) || 41,963 || 63–97
|- align="center" bgcolor="bbffbb"
| 161 || September 27 || Cardinals || 5 – 2 || Delgado (4–4) || Maness (6–4) || Reed (32) || 39,843 || 64–97
|- align="center" bgcolor="ffbbbb"
| 162 || September 28 || Cardinals || 1 – 0 || Masterson (7–9) || Collmenter (11–9) || Martínez (1) || 30,617 || 64–98
|-

Roster

Player stats
Up to date .

Both tables are sortable.

Batting
Note: G = Games played; AB = At bats; R = Runs scored; H = Hits; 2B = Doubles; 3B = Triples; HR = Home runs; RBI = Runs batted in; AVG = Batting average; SB = Stolen bases

Complete batting stats can be found here .

Pitching
Note: W = Wins; L = Losses; ERA = Earned run average; G = Games pitched; GS = Games started; SV = Saves; IP = Innings pitched; H = Hits allowed; R = Runs allowed; ER = Earned runs allowed; BB = Walks allowed; K = Strikeouts 

Complete pitching stats can be found here .

Farm system

League Champions: Hillsboro

References

External links

 2014 Arizona Diamondbacks season at Baseball Reference
 2014 Arizona Diamondbacks season Official Site

Arizona Diamondbacks season
Arizona Diamondbacks
Arizona Diamondbacks seasons